Roosevelt High School is a public high school in Portland, Oregon, United States.

History
Roosevelt High School opened in the St. Johns neighborhood of Portland in 1922 as a replacement for James John High School. James John High School – named after James John, the founder of the St. Johns settlement – was constructed in 1911 when St. Johns was still a separate city from Portland. The school became a part of Portland Public Schools after St. Johns was annexed to Portland in 1915. James John High School was temporarily closed in 1920 due to safety concerns, and the Portland school board decided to rebuild the school at a new location. The new school was initially intended to be named after its predecessor, but received its current name in honor of President Theodore Roosevelt, who had died in 1919.

Roosevelt High School was dedicated in June 1922, with efforts being made to complete its construction in time for the school's opening in September. The building, which was modelled after the design of Franklin High School, had 24 rooms and a capacity of 1,200 students. While James John only had an enrollment of 400 students in its final year, enrollment at Roosevelt was expected to be much higher as it would be taking surplus students from Jefferson and Lincoln high schools. A 1922 St. Johns Review article called for the streets surrounding Roosevelt High School to be paved so that fire trucks and other vehicles would be able to access the school more easily.  

During the late 1940s, a wave of new students began to enter the Portland school system as a result of the post-war baby boom. In response, voters approved a $25 million building levy in 1947 with the goal of constructing, renovating, and expanding schools across Portland. Roosevelt, in particular, was described as Portland's "worst crowded high school" in 1950, with needs including the completion of a wing already under construction and the addition of a new gymnasium.  The bricks for construction of the building were furnished by the Forest Grove Clay Products Company in Forest Grove Oregon

In 1992, Roosevelt became one of six Oregon high schools to pilot a school-to-work training program described by The New York Times as "one of the most aggressive efforts in the country to address shortcomings in job training." The program required sophomores to choose one of six career tracks and emphasized career-related applications in academic course work. The program was praised by some, who cited Roosevelt's lower dropout rate once the program was implemented, but criticized by others, who argued that it forced students to make career decisions at too young of an age.

In 2004, Roosevelt was split into 3 small schools: the Pursuit Of Wellness Education at Roosevelt (POWER), the Spanish-English International School (SEIS), and the Arts, Communication, and Technology School (ACT). Each small school focused on certain academics and career related pathways. POWER focused on math and science, SEIS focused on language immersion, and ACT offered courses in fine, visual, and performing arts. The rationale behind the split was to improve academic achievement by allowing teachers and students to interact in a more intimate and specialized environment.

Roosevelt received a $7.7 million federal grant in the summer of 2010 to improve school conditions and to return the school to a comprehensive campus by 2012. This was done to promote diversity in the classrooms and unite the school budget.

Roosevelt began a modernization process in 2015 as part of a $482 million bond measure aimed at improving schools across Portland. The project included a new wing for the school – with a community center, gymnasium, and commons area, among other additions – and renovations to the original 1921 structure. The modernization project was praised by the Business Tribune, which cited its "intertwining benefits of seismic stabilization, historic preservation and improved learning environments". Renovations to the historic 1921 building were completed in 2017.

School profile
In the 2020–2021 school year, Roosevelt's student population was 36% Hispanic, 33.3% White, 15.7% African American, 3.2% Asian, 2.7% Pacific Islander, 1.2% Native American, and 7.8% mixed race.  In 2017, 73% of Roosevelt's seniors graduated on time out of a class size of 274.

Roosevelt is one of the smallest high schools in Portland Public Schools.

Notable alumni
 James Allen, (Class of 1946) - Pioneer of early Portland Television.  Jim Created and played the role of “Rusty Nails” for a generation of Portland children from 1957-1972.  His character became the inspiration for “Krusty the Clown” on The Simpsons.
 Carolyn Davidson, (Class of 1960) - Designer of the Nike Corporation’s trademark “Swoosh”.
 Kenneth E. BeLieu, (Class of 1933) – Served in World War II and the Korean War.  Fought in the Invasion of Normandy, the Battle of the Bulge, and the Western Allied invasion of Germany.  Served presidents Kennedy, Johnson and Nixon in a variety of Department of Defense assignments ultimately becoming Under Secretary of the Army (1971-1973).
 Anna Peterson, (Class of 1965) – Served as Mayor of Salem, the state capital of Oregon, from 2011 through 2016.
 Illmaculate – (AKA Gregory Poe) Battle rapper and hip hop artist from St. Johns, Portland, Oregon
 Robert Robideau, - Member of the American Indian Movement (AIM) and participant in the Wounded Knee incident.
Mike Schrunk, Multnomah County District Attorney
 Terry Schrunk, (Class of 1932) - Firefighter, Multnomah County (Oregon) Sheriff and One of Portland Oregon’s Longest Serving Mayors From 1957-1972.
 Pennie Lane Trumbull, (Class of 1972) - Socialite, philanthropist, businesswoman, and entrepreneur. Her time as a band promoter was chronicled in the 2000 film Almost Famous where she was portrayed by actress Kate Hudson.
 Len Younce, (Class of 1936) – Played football at Oregon State University and for 10 years with the New York Giants - Named to the NFL’s “All 1940’s Team”- Coached for the Saskatchewan Roughriders and Edmonton Eskimos in the Canadian Football League.

Roosevelt High in the Media

 ESPN Outside the Lines (OTL) - Friday Night Lite (2009) Story about Roughriders football in a time of changing demographics.

References

Sources

External links

1922 establishments in Oregon
Buildings and structures in St. Johns, Portland, Oregon
Educational institutions established in 1922
High schools in Portland, Oregon
Portland Public Schools (Oregon)
Public high schools in Oregon